Bernard Anselme (born 3 November 1945) was the 6th Minister-President of Wallonia in Belgium from 11 May 1988 to 7 January 1992.

Biography 
Bernard Anselme was born on 3 November 1945 in Mouscron, Wallonia to a postal worker. After his father was transferred to Libramont-Chevigny, Anselme studied humanities from 1957 to 1963, ending his education in the humanities at Namur in 1963. In 1968, Anselme received a degree in political science, diplomacy and administration from Université Libre de Bruxelles in Brussels. During his time in Brussels, Anselme became involved in the Young FGTB, becoming its assistant secretary in 1964, its secretary in 1968 and serving as its president from 1968 to 1970.

Between 1969 and 1972, Anselme served as the Special Adviser to the Minister for Community Relations, and from 1972 to 1977 served as an adviser to the President of the Walloon Economic Council, . In 1977, Anselme became the Member for Namur, serving in various positions before serving as Wallonia's Secretary of State from 1979 to 1980. In 1985, as a member of Wallonia's regional parliament, Anselme authored a decree establishing Namur as the capital of the Walloon Region. In 1988, Anselme became the Minister-President of the Walloon Region, a position he retained until 7 January 1992. From 1994 to 1999 Anselme served as the Minister for Internal Affairs for the Walloon Region, followed by a few months in the position of Minister for Social Affairs.

On 1 January 2001 Anselme became the Mayor of Namur. In October 2006, following the formation of a coalition between the Christian Democrats, Greens and Liberals, Anselme's Socialist Party was ousted from government for the first time in 30 years. Anselme announced his intention to resign from politics following the election defeat, but was convinced to stay in municipal politics. He currently sits as a Namur municipal councillor.

References 

|-

1945 births
People from Mouscron
Living people
Ministers-President of Wallonia
Ministers-President of the French Community of Belgium
Mayors of places in Belgium
People from Namur (city)
Walloon movement activists
21st-century Belgian politicians